Janusz Zygmunt Kamiński (born June 27, 1959) is a Polish cinematographer and director of film and television. He has established a partnership with Steven Spielberg, working as a cinematographer on his films since 1993. He won the Academy Award for Best Cinematography for his work on Spielberg's holocaust drama Schindler's List and World War II epic Saving Private Ryan (1998). He has also received Academy Award nominations for Amistad (1997), The Diving Bell & the Butterfly (2007) War Horse (2011), Lincoln (2012), and West Side Story (2021). He has also received nominations for five BAFTA Awards, and six American Society of Cinematographers Awards.

In addition to his collaborations with Spielberg, he has also worked with Cameron Crowe, James L. Brooks, and Julian Schnabel. Kamiński has also moved into the field of directing, first with the horror film Lost Souls (2000), and the NBC series The Event (2011) and WE tv series The Divide (2014). In 2019, the American Society of Cinematographers included Schindler's List and Saving Private Ryan, both shot by Kamiński, on the list of the best-photographed films of the 20th century.

Life and career
Kamiński was born in Ziębice, Poland, the son of mother, Jadwiga Celner, and father, Marian Kaminski. In 1981, he emigrated to the United States at the age of 21 after Prime Minister Jaruzelski imposed martial law.

He attended Columbia College in Chicago from 1982 to 1987, graduating with a Bachelor of Arts degree, taking up filmmaking as a profession before attending to the AFI Conservatory, where he graduated with a Master of Fine Arts degree. He worked under cinematographer Phedon Papamichael, first as a gaffer, and eventually as second unit director of photography. He shot numerous B-movies for directors Roger Corman and Katt Shea, as well as the romantic musical comedy Cool as Ice, starring Vanilla Ice.

Kamiński was first discovered by Steven Spielberg in 1991. After seeing the television film Wildflower, Spielberg hired Kamiński to shoot Class of '61, a television film in which Spielberg served as producer.

He twice won the Academy Award for Best Cinematography in the 1990s, for Schindler's List and Saving Private Ryan.  He has been nominated five additional times for Amistad, The Diving Bell and the Butterfly, War Horse, Lincoln, and West Side Story. In 2010, he was awarded the Franklin J. Schaffner Alumni Medal by the AFI Conservatory.

Kamiński became a member of the American Society of Cinematographers (ASC) in 1994, but resigned in 2006.

Kamiński was married to actress Holly Hunter from 1995 until 2001. In 2004, he married ABC reporter Rebecca Rankin; they divorced in 2010.

Filmography

Film 
Director of photography

Second unit photography

 Additional photography 

Director
 Lost Souls (2000)
 Hania (2007)

Television 
Director of photography

 Director

 Executive Producer 
 Ukrainians in Exile (2022)

Awards and nominations

See also
Cinema of Poland
List of Polish Academy Award winners and nominees
List of Poles

References

External links
 
 Janusz Kamiński at culture.pl

1959 births
AFI Conservatory alumni
Best Cinematographer Academy Award winners
Best Cinematography BAFTA Award winners
Columbia College Chicago alumni
German-language film directors
Independent Spirit Award winners
Living people
People from Ziębice
Polish cinematographers
Polish emigrants to the United States
Polish film directors